Denmark–Egypt relations are foreign relations between Denmark and Egypt. Denmark has an embassy in Cairo, and consulates in Suez, Port Said and Cairo. Egypt has an embassy in Copenhagen. Both countries are members of the Union for the Mediterranean.

The Jyllands-Posten Muhammad cartoons controversy in 2006 caused a diplomatic crisis between Denmark and Egypt.

After Per Stig Møller's visit to President Hosni Mubarak in 2008, Mubarak described the bilateral relations as good and fruitful and expressed his support for their further expansion, especially in economic cooperation.

Political relations
The Egyptian Minister of Foreign Affairs, Aboul Gheit, wrote several letters to the Prime Minister of Denmark and to the United Nations Secretary-General explaining that they did not want the Prime Minister to prosecute Jyllands-Posten; they only wanted "an official Danish statement underlining the need for and the obligation of respecting all religions and desisting from offending their devotees to prevent an escalation which would have serious and far-reaching consequences". Subsequently, the Egyptian government played a leading role in defusing the issue in the Middle East.

Egyptian newspaper al-Fagr reprints some of the cartoons, describing them as a "continuing insult" and a "racist bomb". and argued that they are blasphemous to people of the Muslim faith, are intended to humiliate a Danish minority, or are a manifestation of ignorance about the history of Western imperialism.

Danish reaction to the Egyptian Revolution of 2011

During the Egyptian Revolution of 2011, Minister for Foreign Affairs Lene Espersen strongly condemned the alleged Egyptian authorities' actions against the protests. Danish-Palestinian politician Naser Khader urged Mubarak to resign. Danish Foreign Ministry also warned against all travel to Egypt.

Cooperation
In 1940s commercial exchanges between Denmark and Egypt amounted 7 million DKK. An agreement on Culture, Science and Education was signed on 29 October 1972. In 1970, Denmark assisted Egypt with 9.7 million DKK, for wheat and flour.

Development assistance
Egypt was from 1989 to 2008 a program country for Denmark. 6 billion dollars were given for the support of the Egyptian projects, including a wind farm in Zafarana close to Ain Sukhna.

High level visits
In October 2008, Per Stig Møller visited Hosni Mubarak. Hosni Mubarak visited Denmark on 17 December 2009. A delegation from the Egyptian Education Committee visited Denmark in 2007.

See also
 Foreign relations of Denmark 
 Foreign relations of Egypt

References

External links